Dale Leonard Hackbart (born July 21, 1938) is a former American football defensive back who played twelve seasons in the National Football League for the Green Bay Packers, Washington Redskins, Minnesota Vikings, St. Louis Cardinals, and Denver Broncos from 1960 to 1973.  He also played in the Canadian Football League for the Winnipeg Blue Bombers in 1964 and 1965.

Hackbart initially focused on baseball.  He spent a season playing baseball for the Grand Forks Chiefs; a Class C minor league team in the Pittsburgh Pirates organization.  Bud Grant convinced Hackbart to drop baseball and concentrate on a career in the National Football League.

Hackbart was drafted by the Minnesota franchise in the inaugural 1960 American Football League Draft as a quarterback and "territorial selection." He was drafted in the fifth round of the 1960 NFL draft as a generic "back" by the Packers. As Minnesota would never play in the AFL (the group instead joined the NFL as the Minnesota Vikings), Hackbart joined the Packers. Hackbart would eventually join the Vikings in 1966, by this point solely as a defensive back.

In 1973, Hackbart was involved in an on-field transgression that he eventually took to court.  He asserted that a late hit by Cincinnati Bengals running back Boobie Clark was an intentional tort.

He was with the Denver Broncos and was their starting safety in 1973.

In the first 1973 regular season game against the Cincinnati Bengals Hackbart's neck was fractured. "It was just before halftime and the Bengals had the ball at around the 45 yard line going in. Boobie Clark came out of a split backfield and ran down the hash marks. I was playing free safety so I dropped back to the center of the field. The ball went up in the air and I converged into the endzone. Billy Thompson, who was playing left corner for the Broncos, jumped in front of me and Boobie Clark and intercepted the pass. I tried to block Boobie and landed on the ground. When I came up on to one knee watching Thompson run the ball, Boobie came up from behind me and whacked me in the back of the head, with a right fore-arm  and drove me into the ground, after the Play was finished.  My left arm went numb ! At halftime in the locker room I couldn’t take off my helmet so I was packed in ice around my neck and helmet." Hackbart did not at the time report the happening to his coaches or to anyone else during the game. However, because of the pain which he experienced he was unable to play golf the next day. He did not seek medical attention, but the continued pain caused him to report this fact and the incident to the Bronco trainer who gave him treatment. Apparently he played on the specialty teams for two successive Sundays, but after that the Broncos released him on waivers. (He was in his thirteenth year as a player.) He sought medical help and it was then that X-rays were taken, which revealed that the C4, 5, 6, and 7 vertebrae on his neck were fractured. This injury ended his football career.

In 1974 neurosurgeons told Hackbart that if he didn't have surgery to repair the damage, he would lose use of his left arm, shoulder, and any muscles involved with the damaged vertebrae. The Broncos claimed they were not liable. Hackbart hired an attorney, Rodger Johnson of Johnson & Mahony, and brought a suit against the Bengals. Hackbart v. the Cincinnati Bengals became a precedent setting case. In the case the courts ruled that in the course of a professional football game an intentional infliction of an injury by one player upon another might constitute a tort.

As a result of the lawsuit, the National Football League mandated that all stadiums had to be equipped with X-ray machines. The head slap maneuver which injured Hackbart was banned. Later, rules against spearing with the helmet and helmet to helmet contact were created. Hackbart settled with the Bengals and the Broncos filed a Workman's Compensation claim which paid for the surgery that was performed in 1976.

The case was eventually appealed to the Tenth Circuit Court of Appeals in 1979 and has become a key point of discussion in several first year law school tort classes. Hackbart v. Cincinnati Bengals, Inc., 601 F.2d 516 (10th Cir. 1979).

NFL Green Bay Packers 1961 50 Year Championship Reunion
Dale attended the 2011 Reunion at Lambeau Field, in Green Bay Wisconsin, October 2, 2011.

References

External links
 Pro Football Reference

1938 births
Living people
Sportspeople from Madison, Wisconsin
Players of American football from Wisconsin
American football cornerbacks
American football safeties
Green Bay Packers players
Washington Redskins players
Minnesota Vikings players
St. Louis Cardinals (football) players
Denver Broncos players
Winnipeg Blue Bombers players
Wisconsin Badgers football players
Baseball players from Wisconsin
Grand Forks Chiefs players